Gwenaëlle Aubry (born 2 April 1971) is a French novelist and philosopher.

Biography 
After two years of preparatory classes at the Lycée Henri-IV in Paris, Aubry began her studies at the École Normale Supérieure in 1989 at the age of eighteen, earning an agrégation in Philosophy in 1992. She then received the Knox Scholarship at Trinity College, Cambridge, where she earned a Master of Philosophy. In 1999 she received a Doctorate in Philosophy from the Université de Paris IV-Sorbonne.

She was an associate professor in ancient philosophy at the Université de Nancy II from 1999 to 2002. She now serves as a Director of Research at the Centre national de la recherche scientifique [National Center for Scientific Research] and an associate member of the Centre international d'étude de la philosophie française contemporaine [International Center for the Study of Contemporary French Philosophy] (ENS-Ulm). She is also a member of the reading committee at the Théâtre national de la Colline. She is married to the philosopher Quentin Meillassoux.

Her work 
She published her first novel, Le Diable détacheur, in 1999.

2002 saw the publication of L'Isolée, which was inspired by Florence Rey, and then revised and expanded in 2003 with the addition of the short narrative L'Isolement.

In 2007, after a residence at the Villa Medici, she published Notre vie s'use en transfigurations, excerpts of which were staged by Sarah Oppenheim for the play "Donnez-moi donc un corps!", put on in 2017 by the Théâtre du Soleil.

In 2009, Aubry received the Prix Femina for Personne, an alphabet-novel, which is a portrait of a melancholic "from twenty-six angles with nothing at the center". The book was also short-listed for the Prix Médicis, the Grand Prix du Roman de l'Académie française, the Prix Novembre, and the Prix de Flore. It has been translated into a dozen languages and was published in the United States as No One in Trista Selous's translation with a preface by Rick Moody.

In 2012 Partages came out, a "book of hauntings", which mirrors, sometimes on alternating pages, the voices of two young girls, one Jewish, the other Palestinian, in Israel during the Second Intifada. It was long-listed for the Prix Goncourt and was a finalist for the Grand Prix du Roman de l'Académie française.

In 2015, she published "Lazare mon amour", a prismatic portrait of Sylvia Plath, in L'Une et L'Autre. She then adapted it into a play, which was published separately in 2016.

In 2016 the autobiographical novel Perséphone 2014 came out. Performed by the author and accompanied by the guitarist Sébastien Martel, the text was also staged by Anne Monfort on the occasion of the tenth Festival de Caves. Partial translations into English have appeared from Benjamin Eldon Stevens (Arion, winter 2018, 25.3: 161–173) and from Wendeline A. Hardenberg (Asymptote, April 2019).

In 2018 her novel La Folie Elisa was published. A staged version featuring Aubry, guitarist Sébastien Martel, and Judith Chemla was performed in November 2018.

Aubry produced a radio play adaptation of Hermann Broch's The Death of Virgil for France Culture and has written literary studies of Yves Bonnefoy, W. G. Sebald, and Georges Perec, as well as short works published in magazines and journals, particularly La Nouvelle Revue française. She is also the author of several books and a number of articles on ancient philosophy and its contemporary reception, as well as a translator from ancient Greek (Plotinus, Porphyrus, Proclus). In 2018 Genèse du Dieu souverain. Archéologie de la puissance II was published, the second volume following Dieu sans la puissance. The author rejected the first mover of Aristotle could ever have been the first principle of all things because it is solely able to attract entities capable of its imitation, and declared to choose the potence of all beings (in ancient Greek: dunamis pantōn) described by Plotinus and Plato.

Major works

Le Diable détacheur, Actes Sud, 1999 (reissued by Mercure de France, 2012, winner of the Bourse Cino Del Duca)
L'Isolée, Stock, 2002
L'Isolement, Stock, 2003 (L'isolée/L'isolement, reissued by Mercure de France, 2010)
Plotin. Traité 53 (I, 1) Introduction, translation, commentary and notes, Cerf, Collection Les Ecrits de Plotin, 2004
Notre vie s'use en transfigurations, Actes Sud, 2007
Dieu sans la puissance: Dunamis et Energeia chez Aristote et chez Plotin (essai), Vrin, 2007
Le moi et l'intériorité, Vrin, 2008 (editor)
Personne, Mercure de France, 2009 (winner of the Prix Femina)
Partages, Mercure de France, 2012
Lazare mon amour, L'Iconoclaste, 2016
Perséphone 2014, Mercure de France 2016
Genèse du Dieu souverain. Archéologie de la puissance II, Vrin, 2018
La Folie Elisa, Mercure de France, 2018

References

20th-century French novelists
1971 births
Living people
Prix Femina winners
French women novelists
21st-century French novelists
20th-century French women writers
21st-century French women writers
École Normale Supérieure alumni
Alumni of Trinity College, Cambridge
Academic staff of the University of Paris
French women philosophers
20th-century French philosophers
21st-century French philosophers
French Freemasons